Carlos Mario Eluaiza (born June 5, 1965 in Las Flores, Buenos Aires) is a former flyweight boxer from Argentina, who represented his native country at the 1988 Summer Olympics in Seoul, South Korea. There he was eliminated in the second round by USSR's Alexander Makhmutov. Nicknamed El Zurdo and El Vasco, Eluaiza made his professional debut on February 10, 1989. Ten years later he retired, after 27 fights: twenty wins (four ko's) and seven losses.

References
 

1965 births
Living people
Sportspeople from Buenos Aires Province

Flyweight boxers
Boxers at the 1988 Summer Olympics
Olympic boxers of Argentina
Argentine male boxers